William W. Boardman (1771–1847) was an American cordwainer and politician who held office in Saugus, Massachusetts.

Boardman was born in 1771 in Lynn, Massachusetts to Samuel and Abigail Boardman. He ran a shoe shop in an old school house adjacent to his home. He held numerous political offices in Saugus, including Selectman, Town Clerk (1834–1841), and State Representative (1837–1838). He was a member of the Democratic Party. He was married to Julia Davis from 1825 until her death in 1831 and Sabrina Brown from January 1, 1833 until his death on November 7, 1847. He was predeceased by one son, Arthur L. Boardman (1840–1845), from his second marriage.

References

1771 births
1847 deaths
City and town clerks
Democratic Party members of the Massachusetts House of Representatives
People from Saugus, Massachusetts
Shoemakers